Justice O'Connell may refer to:

Jeremiah E. O'Connell (1883–1964), associate justice of the Rhode Island Supreme Court
Kenneth J. O'Connell (1909–2000), chief justice of the Oregon Supreme Court
Stephen C. O'Connell (1916–2001), associate justice of the Florida Supreme Court

See also
Judge O'Connell (disambiguation)